A-bout! (stylized as A-BOUT!) is a Japanese manga series written and illustrated by Ichikawa Masa. It was serialized in Kodansha's shōnen manga magazine Weekly Shōnen Magazine from November 2009 to May 2013, with its chapters collected in 19 tankōbon volumes. It was followed by a sequel, A-bout!! – Asagiri Daikatsuyaku-hen, which ran in the same magazine from June 2013 to March 2014 and concluded in Magazine Special in May of the same year. A third series, A-bout! Surf, was serialized in Kodansha's seinen manga magazine Evening from July 2021 to September 2022.

Plot
The story takes place in Mitsumine High School, the school is notorious for its violent juvenile delinquent students. When Asagiri Shinnosuke transfers to this school, he starts fighting all the class bosses to prove himself as the strongest guy in the school.

Publication
A-bout!, written and illustrated by Ichikawa Masa, was serialized in Kodansha's Weekly Shōnen Magazine from November 25, 2009, to May 15, 2013. Kodansha collected its 165 chapters in 19 tankōbon volumes, released from March 17, 2010, to June 17, 2013.

A direct sequel, was serialized in Weekly Shōnen Magazine from June 12, 2013, to March 12, 2014. Two additional chapters were published in Magazine Special on April 19 and May 20 of the same year. Kodansha collected its chapters in five tankōbon volumes, released from September 17, 2013, to June 17, 2014.

A third series, titled A-bout! Surf, was serialized in Kodansha's seinen manga magazine Evening from July 13, 2021, to September 27, 2022. Kodansha collected its chapters in five tankōbon volumes, released from September 22, 2021, to November 22, 2022

Notes

References

External links
 
 

Kodansha manga
Seinen manga
Shōnen manga
Yankī anime and manga